Keith Bradley (born  in Ellesmere Port, Cheshire) is an English former footballer who is best known for the time he spent with Aston Villa.

Bradley joined Everton as a youth player at the age of 16. After being spotted and approached by Joe Mercer, he signed a professional contract at the age of 18 and spent ten years at the Villa, reaching the League Cup final and playing at Wembley in the 1971–72 season. After leaving Aston Villa, he enjoyed four years playing for Peterborough United until retiring from playing. He then coached the Birmingham City youth team under manager Ron Saunders, leaving in 1986.
He has owned and run his successful restaurant Badgers in Mojacar (Spain) since 1987, where he continues to this day.

References

External links

Up the Posh Bio

Living people
1946 births
People from Ellesmere Port
Sportspeople from Cheshire
English footballers
Association football midfielders
Everton F.C. players
Aston Villa F.C. players
Peterborough United F.C. players
Birmingham City F.C. non-playing staff